Louisa Nersisyan (born July 23, 1977) is an Armenian actress. She is known for her roles in Armenian comedy movies. In the United States, she is best known for her supporting role of Yeva in Tangerine (2015).

Awards and nominations

References

1977 births
Living people
20th-century Armenian actresses
Actresses from Yerevan